USA Jet Airlines is a small American cargo airline with its headquarters on the grounds of Willow Run Airport, and in Van Buren Township, Michigan. USA Jet operates on-demand air charter freight, and formerly passenger flights out of Willow Run Airport. USA Jet Airlines is a division of Ascent Global Logistics (formerly Active Aero Group).

Notability 
A USA Jet DC-9 was used for the filming of the movie Cedar Rapids and another painted for We Are Marshall.

USA Jet flew the Mitt Romney/Paul Ryan presidential campaign flights for the 2012 election year. A VIP MD-83, registration N949NS, was used for Mitt Romney and a VIP DC-9-32, registration N215US was used for Paul Ryan.

In August 2013, USA Jet Airlines became the world's first operator of an MD-80 Passenger-to-Freighter conversion. The aircraft, converted by Aeronautical Engineers, Inc., competes against the Boeing 727 in the cargo market.

In February 2023, USA Jet retired the last of their DC-9 fleet, consisting of 1 DC-9-30 (N208US) and 2 DC-9-10's (N192US, N196US).

Fleet 
As of March 2023, the USA Jet Airlines fleet includes:

Accidents
On July 8, 2008, a DC-9-15F (N199US) crashed onto a roadway while approaching the Plan de Guadalupe International Airport in Saltillo, Mexico while on a scheduled cargo flight from the U.S. The National Transportation Safety Board, which confirmed the death of the pilot, reported no one was injured on the ground. The co-pilot suffered severe burns. Flight 199 departed Detroit-Willow Run Airport, MI (YIP) on July 5 for Hamilton (YHM), Canada to pick up cargo. Automotive parts were loaded on board and the flight continued to Shreveport (SHV) where it arrived at 23:19 CDT. After clearing customs it took off again at 23:48 CDT, bound for Saltillo (SLW), Mexico. The DC-9 crashed in an industrial area 800 m north of the airport. The airplane broke up and burned.
On September 1, 2005, a Falcon 20 struck a flock of mourning doves shortly after rotation at Lorain County, Ohio, causing both engines to flame out. As the gear was retracted, the plane crashed beyond the runway and was destroyed after impact. The crew suffered minor injuries.

References

External links

 
 USA Jet Airlines archived website

American companies established in 1994
Airlines established in 1994
Cargo airlines of the United States
Companies based in Michigan
Charter airlines of the United States
1994 establishments in Michigan
Airlines based in Michigan